Fabio Maggi (born 30 January 1975) is a former professional tennis player from Italy.

Biography
Originally from Spain, Maggi began playing tennis aged seven.

Maggi, who was coached by Jordi Vilaro, turned professional in 1995. On the ATP Tour he had main draw wins over top 100 players Kris Goossens and Stefano Pescosolido during his career. His only Challenger title came at Alpirsbach in 1997, over Stefan Koubek.

He retired from professional tennis in 2001 and has since been head of a tennis academy in Cunit, Spain.

Challenger titles

Singles: (1)

References

External links
 
 

1975 births
Living people
Italian male tennis players
Spanish emigrants to Italy
Tennis players from Madrid